Airport Freight Forwarding Centre (AFFC) is the leading warehouse service provider in Hong Kong and the only warehousing and office facility at the Hong Kong International Airport in Chek Lap Kok, New Territories, Hong Kong. AFFC is a wholly owned subsidiary of Sun Hung Kai Properties, one of the largest property developers in Hong Kong.

Link
 Airport Freight Forwarding Centre

References

Chek Lap Kok
Sun Hung Kai Properties
Transport companies established in 1998
Logistics companies of China
1998 establishments in Hong Kong